The Wrong Arm of the Law is a 1963 British comedy film directed by Cliff Owen and starring Peter Sellers, Bernard Cribbins, Lionel Jeffries, John Le Mesurier and Bill Kerr. It was partly written by Ray Galton and Alan Simpson and made by Romulus Films.

The film opened at the Warner Theatre in London's West End on 14 March 1963.

Plot
In London, a gang of criminals from Australia led by Jack Coombes (Bill Kerr) impersonate policemen to carry out robberies. Local gang leader "Pearly" Gates (Sellers), who operates from the cover of a French couturier, finds his takings cut severely, and blames rival crook "Nervous" O'Toole (Bernard Cribbins). When it emerges that they are both being scammed by the same gang, they join forces, along with Lionel Jeffries' Police Inspector "Nosey" Parker, to bring the so-called "I.P.O. mob" (I.P.O. - Impersonating a Police Officer) to justice. Nanette Newman provides the love interest, John Le Mesurier plays a senior policeman, and a young Michael Caine has a small and uncredited role as a young PC. Other uncredited roles include John Junkin (Maurice), Dennis Price (Educated Ernest), Cardew Robinson (Postman), Dick Emery (Man in Flat 307), Mario Fabrizi (Van Driver), John Harvey (Police Station Sergeant), Harold Siddons (PC in Basement Garage), Jack Silk (Police Station PC), Derek Guyler (non-speaking PC at Scotland Yard), Gerald Sim (Airfield Official) and Marianne Stone (“The bird in the front row” at Gangsters' Meeting).

Cast

Production and reception
Many of the robbery scenes were filmed around Beaconsfield and Uxbridge. Filming locations include; the early Post Office robbery at Burkes Parade/Post Office Lane Beaconsfield, the gang meeting at Havens Court, Ealing, the Bullion Transport robbery at Cowley Mill Road/Waterloo Road Uxbridge combined with Bushy Park Road Teddington, and the escape flight from Denham Airport.

The film features an Aston Martin DB4 GT.

Peter Sellers loved the 1961 Aston Marton DB4GT so much that he bought the car after shooting the film—contingent on the engine being replaced with a 4.0-litre Lagonda Rapide.

Box office
It was one of the 12 most popular films at the British box office in 1963. According to Kine Weekly the four most popular films at the British box office in 1963 were From Russia With Love, Summer Holiday, Tom Jones and The Great Escape, followed by, in alphabetical order, Doctor in Distress, The Fast Lady, Girls! Girls! Girls!, Heaven's Above, Jason and the Argonauts, In Search of the Castaways, It Happened at the World's Fair, The Longest Day, On the Beat, Sodom and Gomorrah, The V. I. Ps, and The Wrong Arm of the Law.

In a positive review in The New York Times, Bosley Crowther concluded, "Of course, it is strictly lightweight clowning, longer on plot than on wit and wholly dependent on the archness of Mr. Sellers to give it a cachet. Others in the cast are amusing, especially Mr. Jeffries as the cop, but the enterprise stands by the stiffening of Mr. Sellers's cunning roguishness."

References

External links
 
 
 The Wrong Arm of the Law at Memorable TV
 
 

1963 films
1960s crime comedy films
British black-and-white films
British Lion Films films
1960s heist films
British crime comedy films
Films directed by Cliff Owen
Films scored by Richard Rodney Bennett
Films set in London
British heist films
1963 comedy films
1960s English-language films
1960s British films